The Court for Crown Cases Reserved was an English appellate court for criminal cases established in 1848 to hear references from the trial judge. It did not allow a retrial, only judgment on a point of law. Neither did it create a right of appeal and only a few selected cases were heard every year.

History 
The Court for Crown Cases Reserved was created by the Crown Cases Act 1848, introduced in the House of Lords by Lord Campbell. Under the act, after a conviction, the trial judge in a criminal case could refer the case by way of case stated to the court. A case that was reserved would then be heard by at least five judges, including at least one Chief Justice or Chief Baron.

The court could only hear appeals on a point of law; it could quash a conviction, but not order a retrial or alter a sentence.

It was superseded by the Court of Criminal Appeal in 1907.

Notable cases referred to the court
R v Prince (1875)
R v Coney (1882)

References

Footnotes

Bibliography

Former courts and tribunals in England and Wales
Legal history of England
English criminal law
1848 establishments in England
1907 disestablishments in England
Courts and tribunals established in 1848
Courts and tribunals disestablished in 1907